Sago (also known as Malintang) is a mountain in West Sumatra, Indonesia. It is near to the city of Payakumbuh and the town of Batusangkar.

Sago
Landforms of West Sumatra